Thomas Norman Thompson (born 1894) was an English professional footballer. He played for Sunderland and Gillingham between 1919 and 1924, making over 70 appearances in the Football League.

References

1894 births
Year of death missing
English footballers
Gillingham F.C. players
Sunderland A.F.C. players
Association football midfielders
Sportspeople from Seaham
Footballers from County Durham